Legislators in the 7th assembly of the Croatian Parliament served from 22 December 2011 to 28 December 2015. The assembly came into existence following the December 2011 parliamentary election and consisted of 151 representatives elected from 10 geographical and two special electoral districts. It dissolved formally on 28 September 2015, with the next parliamentary election held on 8 November 2015.

Parliamentary officials

The Speaker of the Croatian Parliament (or President) from 22 December 2011 until his death on 30 September 2012 was Boris Šprem, member of the Social Democratic Party of Croatia. Deputy speaker Josip Leko was acting Speaker of the Sabor until himself being elected as the new Speaker.

Vice presidents of Sabor are Dragica Zgrebec (SDP), Nenad Stazić (SDP), Milorad Batinić (SDP), Tomislav Čuljak (HDZ) and Željko Reiner (HDZ).

Jadranka Kosor and Vladimir Šeks, two HDZ's vice presidents, were removed from their posts on 12 June 2012 during a session of HDZ's presidency and replaced by Čuljak and Reiner. Dragica Zgrebec was named a new Vice president to replace Josip Leko who had been elected Speaker after the death of Boris Šprem.

Composition
On the basis of the parliamentary election of 2011, the composition of the Sabor  is as follows:

By parliamentary club

By political party

MPs by party

Changes
Note that a number of MPs who are high-ranking members of parties in the ruling coalition were subsequently appointed to various ministerial and governmental positions, while others continued to serve as city mayors. In such cases they are required by Croatian law to put their parliamentary mandate on hiatus for the duration of their other term of office and in the meantime their seats are then taken by a party-appointed replacement MP. Those replacements are not documented here. The table below only lists changes which affected party seat totals in the 7th Sabor.

References

Lists of representatives in the modern Croatian Parliament by term
2010s in Croatia